The Visitors: Bastille Day is a 2016 French-Belgian-Czech comedy film directed by Jean-Marie Poiré.

It is the third film in the trilogy Les Visiteurs, following The Visitors II: The Corridors of Time released eighteen years earlier in 1998. The first film in the series was released twenty-three years earlier in 1993.

The film was produced by Sidonie Dumas (Gaumont), Sylvain Goldberg and Serge de Poucques (Nexus Factory), Christian Clavier (Ouille Productions) and Jean-Marie Poiré. Both Poiré and Clavier co-wrote the script, as was also the case for the two previous films.

Only three actors from the two previous films appear in this third one : Christian Clavier, Jean Reno and Marie-Anne Chazel. Of those three actors, only Reno and Clavier play the same characters that they played in the previous films, namely the medieval knight Godefroy de Montmirail and his squire Jacquouille la Fripouille. They are accompanied by new protagonists played by Franck Dubosc, Karin Viard, Sylvie Testud, Ary Abittan, Alex Lutz and Pascal N'Zonzi.

Filmed from April to June 2015 in the Czech Republic and Belgium, the film is, after the remake Just Visiting (2001), the second film in the franchise not to have been filmed in France. It also marked the return of Jean-Marie Poiré to film directing after a long break of almost fourteen years. The Visitors: Bastille Day was a commercial failure in France.

Plot 
After Béatrice de Montmirail (played by Muriel Robin in the second opus) added an ill-chosen liqueur (Grand Marnier) in the time-travel potion during her niece-in-law's wedding, the time-traveling medieval knight Godefroy de Montmirail and his servant Jacquouille la Fripouille arrive in 1793, in the middle of the French revolution, and find themselves caught up in the Reign of Terror. They meet Jacquouillet, the descendant of Jacquouille, who serves as a public accuser. Godefroy also meets one of his own descendants, who tries to escape the revolution. Godefroy and his squire help him to escape, while also attempting to find a descendant of Eusæbius the Enchanter, who sent them forward in time in the first place, so that they can go back to their own period of time.

Cast 

 Christian Clavier as Jacquouille la Fripouille / Jacquouillet / Edmond Jacquart
 Jean Reno as Godefroy Amaury de Malfête, comte de Montmirail, d'Apremont et de Papincourt
 Franck Dubosc as Gonzague de Montmirail / François Montmirail
 Karin Viard as Adélaïde de Montmirail
 Sylvie Testud as Charlotte de Robespierre / Geneviève Carraud-Robespierre
 Marie-Anne Chazel as Prune
 Ary Abittan as Lorenzo Baldini, marquis de Portofino
 Alex Lutz as Robert de Montmirail
 Stéphanie Crayencour as Victoire-Églantine de Montmirail
 Pascal N'Zonzi as Philibert
 Frédérique Bel as Flore
 Nicolas Vaude as Maximilien de Robespierre
 Christian Hecq as Jean-Paul Marat
 Christelle Cornil as Simone Marat
 Lorànt Deutsch as Jean-Marie Collot d'Herbois
 Mathieu Spinosi as Louis Antoine de Saint-Just
 François Bureloup as Georges Couthon
 Nicolas Lumbreras as Jacques-Nicolas Billaud-Varenne
 Cyril Lecomte as Joseph Fouché
 Alexandre von Sivers as Eusèbe
 Dimitri Storoge as Commissaire Verdier
 Serge Papagalli as the coachman
 Véronique Boulanger as Élise
 Éric De Staercke as Dutch duke
 Patrick Descamps as Louis VI "le Gros", King of France
 David Salles as Ralph I of Vermandois
 Annie Grégorio as Honorine
 Götz Otto as Colonel Wurtz
 Urbain Cancelier as the chief jailer at the prison of Issoudun
 Jean-Luc Couchard as the accuser Legendre
 Guillaume Briat as Robinot
 Joëlle Sevilla as Mrs. Robinot
 Julie-Marie Parmentier as Norah
 Chantal Pirotte as Catherine Théot
 Elliot Goldberg as Thibaud de Montmirail
 Horatia Taittinger as Marie-Thérèse de Montmirail

References

External links 

 
 

2016 films
2010s fantasy comedy films
Films about time travel
Czech fantasy comedy films
French fantasy comedy films
Belgian fantasy comedy films
French Revolution films
Films set in Belgium
Films set in the 12th century
Films set in 1793
Films set in the Middle Ages
Gaumont Film Company films
Cultural depictions of Jean-Paul Marat
Films shot in the Czech Republic
Films directed by Jean-Marie Poiré
2010s historical comedy films
French historical comedy films
2016 comedy films
2010s French-language films
French-language Belgian films
2010s French films